Protarum is a monotypic genus of flowering plants in the family (Araceae). The single species composing the genus is Protarum sechellarum. It is endemic to the Seychelles. This species was previously placed in the subfamily Colocasioideae in the tribe Protareae, but it has since been reclassified to the subfamily Aroideae in the tribe Colocasieae.

References

Aroideae
Monotypic Araceae genera
Endemic flora of Seychelles